Power Rangers Jungle Fury is the sixteenth season of the American television series Power Rangers, and is an adaptation of Juken Sentai Gekiranger, the thirty-first Japanese Super Sentai series.

The season premiered on February 18, 2008 as part of Jetix on Toon Disney; it would be the last season to air on both entities before the launch of Disney XD in February 2009.

Synopsis
For over 10,000 years, a spirit of pure evil known as Dai Shi has been locked away and safely guarded by the Pai Zhua - The Order of the Claw - a secretive Kung Fu clan. The Pai Zhua select their three top members, Jarrod, Theo Martin, and Lily Chilman, to become the new guardians of Dai Shi. Jarrod's arrogant and bullying nature led to him being excluded. Instead, a rookie named Casey Rhodes is chosen.

During the initiation ceremony, Jarrod returns and attacks Master Mao, inadvertently breaking the vessel containing Dai Shi's essence as he does so. The freed Dai Shi kills Master Mao and takes over Jarrod's body. The new guardians travel to the city of Ocean Bluff to seek their new master and find him to be a man named Robert "RJ" James - chef and owner of Jungle Karma Pizza.  After testing guardians, RJ grants them the powers and abilities of Jungle Fury Power Rangers. Making the Earth's only hope to stop Dai Shi - who along with his Lieutenant Camille, other henchmen, and the army of undead Rinshi warriors is attempting to take over the world and allow animals to rule over humans.

Initially, RJ acts only as Sensei and trainer to the Power Rangers, but as the series progresses he joins their ranks as the Jungle Fury Purple Wolf Ranger. During this time, they are also joined by Dominic "Dom" Hargan who studied with RJ, and Fran - originally a customer then an employee of Jungle Karma Pizza. Dominic joins as the White Rhino Power Ranger, and Fran is enlisted to watch the monitors and advise of Rinshi attacks while RJ is with the other Power Rangers. Eventually, Camille is targeted by henchmen Scorch and Snapper who are jealous of her popularity with Dai Shi - although, in reality, it is Jarrod's own human spirit fighting against Dai Shi she is attracted to. As a result, she turns against both them and Dai Shi, enabling Jarrod to throw off its spirit control, and the two join the Power Rangers who use their animal spirits finally to defeat Dai Shi and its forces.

In the epilogue, a more mature and responsible Jarrod goes back to the Pai Zhua to begin his training again, followed by Camille, who later returns as a Power Ranger in her own right. Lily, Theo, and RJ remain at Jungle Karma Pizza. Dominic and Fran backpack around the world and Casey becomes a teacher at the Pai Zhua - with Jarrod and Camille among his students.

Cast and characters 
Jungle Fury Rangers
 Jason Smith as Casey Rhodes, the Jungle Fury Red Ranger
 Anna Hutchison as Lily Chilman, the Jungle Fury Yellow Ranger Ranger.
 Aljin Abella as Theo Martin, the Jungle Fury Blue Ranger.
 David de Lautour as Robert "RJ" James, the Jungle Fury Wolf Ranger.
 Nikolai Nikolaeff as Dominic "Dom" Hargan, the Jungle Fury Rhino Ranger.

Jungle Fury Spirit Rangers
 Bruce Allpress as Master Phant, the Green Elephant Spirit Ranger.
 Oliver Driver as Master Swoop, the Black Bat Spirit Ranger.
 Paul Gittins as Master Fin, the Aqua Shark Spirit Ranger.

Supporting characters
 Sarah Thomson as Fran
 Kelson Henderson as the voice of Flit
 Nathaniel Lees as Master Mao 
 Michelle Langstone As Master Guin
 Stig Eldred as Master Rilla
 Andrew Laing as Master Lope

Villains
 Bede Skinner as Jarrod/Dai Shi
 Holly Shanahan as Camille
 Geoff Dolan as the voice of Dai Shi
 Cameron Rhodes as the voice of Carnisoar
 Elisabeth Easther as the voice of Jellica
 Derek Judge as the voice of Grizzaka
 Mark Wright as the voice of Scorch
 Richard Simpson as the voice of Snapper
 Jared Turner as the voice of Whiger (In Episode 29)

Episodes

References

External links

 Official Power Rangers Website
 
 Power Rangers Jungle Fury at TVGuide.com

 
Jungle Fury
Television shows set in California
Television shows filmed in New Zealand
2000s American science fiction television series
2008 American television series debuts
2008 American television series endings
American Broadcasting Company original programming
American children's action television series
American children's adventure television series
American children's fantasy television series
English-language television shows
Martial arts television series
Television series by Disney
Television series about size change
Television shows adapted into video games